Yugoslav Army, Army of Yugoslavia, or Military of Yugoslavia may refer to:

 Royal Yugoslav Army (1918–1941), the army of the Kingdom of Yugoslavia
 Yugoslav National Liberation Army (1941–1945), the Yugoslav communist-led resistance movement during World War II best known as the Partisans
 Yugoslav People's Army (1945–1992), the army of the Socialist Federal Republic of Yugoslavia
 Yugoslav Army (Federal Republic of Yugoslavia) (1992–2003), the armed forces of Serbia and Montenegro
 Yugoslav Army (basketball team), a men's basketball team in Belgrade, Yugoslavia from 1944 to 1946

See also 
 Yugoslav Air Force
 Yugoslav Navy